The Resistance: Rise of The Runaways is the second studio album by American metalcore band Crown the Empire. The album was released on July 22, 2014, through Rise Records. Akin to their debut album features Joey Sturgis, but also features Dan Korneff as the producer as well. It is the band's first album to not feature keyboardist Austin Duncan, as well as the last album to feature lead guitarist Benn Suede, who departed from the band in 2015. It is also the last concept album the band have written.

Background and recording
It was announced by the band's label, Rise Records, that they would be going into a studio in Michigan on January 3, 2014, with Joey Sturgis producing the album. Later the next month, the band released a teaser for a new song to be featured on the album. The same month they released a statement revealing that they had completed recording drums and were continuing with the other instruments, and also that producer Dan Korneff will also be aiding in the band's production.

Composition

Themes
The album serves as a sequel to the band's debut album The Fallout and is set hundreds of years after the album. It follows the story of the Runaways, a group of rebels who overthrow oppressive regimes.

Release and promotion
The album was officially announced on June 18 by the band and was given the title The Resistance: Rise of The Runaways, a release date of July 22 and its artwork was also released. The announcement was made on the official YouTube channel of Rise Records with a teaser trailer, which, along with the title, release date and artwork, also contained a teaser for a track from the upcoming album. A day later, the first single and second track "Initiation" was released.

After the album's release, the band supported the British rock band Asking Alexandria in the UK throughout October and November.

Critical reception

The Resistance: Rise of The Runaways was welcomed with positive reception by critics. Review aggregator Metacritic gave the album an 82 out of 100 based on 4 professional reviews, citing "universal acclaim". In a four-and-a-half star review from Alternative Press, Phil Freeman averring, "Crown The Empire have stepped up in a big way, with every aspect of The Resistance: Rise of The Runaways coming across bigger, harder and just more than their full-length debut". Rob Sayce at Rock Sound says "Talk about impeccable timing. In its propensity for Hollywood-style melodrama and barrage of arena-friendly hooks, Crown The Empire's second album is both relentlessly on trend and yet relatively individual, succeeding where previous effort The Fallout so often faltered", bestowing a seven out of ten upon the work. In a three-and-a-half star review from AllMusic, Gregory Heaney claiming, "Crown the Empire widen their dynamic range with the simultaneously soaring and punishing...  In fact, this theatricality is easily the album's most engaging feature, making The Resistance: Rise of The Runaway a unique offering in an otherwise dull post-hardcore landscape."

Lais Martins Waring for Big Cheese believing "The Resistance probably won't change any lives, but Crown the Empire should be proud of their second album, because it's pretty damn enjoyable. They're onto a good thing here. Keep an eye on them", bequeathing the project a seven out of ten. In a nine out of ten review for Outburn, Brooke Daly tells "The highlight of The Resistance: Rise of The Runaways is the musicianship... The album sounds progressive while maintaining their core sound. They have honed it, creating a thrilling album in the process." Nathaniel Lay of New Noise remarks "Rise of The Runaways is a bit more deliberate and elaborate in design... an album of fair size, and therefore offers plenty of content... The Resistance is also certainly a worthy release for its scene. Crown the Empire are most definitely talented musicians, and they could be onto something here. Maybe in an album or two, they'll become unstoppable", conferring a four star rating upon the project. Thomas Doyle of Kerrang! gave the album four K's out of a possible five, praising the concept album for not trying to be too clever and resulting in overblown monstrosities, and goes on to say that it feels energised and packed with the energy and spirit of metalcore music with an added narrative.

In an eight out of ten review for Mind Equals Blown, Emma Guido underscoring, "From what it looks like, The Resistance has proved that they are capable of creating a storm, or rather a rebellion, in the music scene. They have a unique style, incredible talent, and a faithful fan base, making this breakthrough band the next big thing." Matthew Sievers articulates how "The Resistance is another staple in this band's already blazing career that will push them so far into the limelight, they'll be rubbing their eyes in disbelief", giving the project four and a half stars. In an eight out of ten review at Bring the Noise, Matt Borucki ascertaining "The Resistance: Rise of The Runaways is more mature and more sophisticated, yet still holds the youthful glow that turned heads in the first place."

Commercial performance
The album sold more than 24,000 copies in its debut week of August 9, 2014 by Billboard, whilst the album charted at No. 7 on the Billboard 200. It also debuted at No. 1 on the Top Rock Albums and Hard  Rock Albums chart. The album has sold 72,000 copies in the United States as of July 2016.

Track listing

Personnel
Credits adapted from AllMusic.

Crown the Empire
 Andrew "Andy Leo" Rockhold – lead vocals, keyboards, programming
 Dave Escamilla – co-lead vocals, additional guitar on "Rise of the Runaways"
 Bennett "Benn Suede" Vogelman – lead guitar, backing vocals, additional production, mixing
 Brandon Hoover – rhythm guitar, backing vocals
 Hayden Tree – bass
 Brent Taddie – drums, percussion

Additional musicians
 Bailey Crego of The White Noise – additional guitar
 Dave Eggar – cello
 Rachel Golub – violin
 Chip Lambert – percussion

Additional personnel
 Dan Korneff – production, engineering
 Brendan Barone – additional production, composition, creative direction, instrumentation, vocals
 Alex Prieto – additional production
 Nathan Cannon – mixing, vocals
 Kris Crummett – mixing
 Joey Sturgis – mastering
 Crown the Empire – composition, instrumentation
 Stevie Aiello – composition
 Derek Brewer – management
 JJ Cassiere and Tom Taaffe – booking

Charts

Release history

References 

2014 albums
Rise Records albums
Crown the Empire albums